Ronald Mallory (June 17, 1932 – July 7, 2021) was an artist who worked in New York City and Milan, Italy, and later lived in San Miguel de Allende Mexico. In the sixties, he was one of the foundational members of the kinetic art movement. In particular, his works involving mercury and acrylic have become icons, and are represented in many collections, including the Museum of Modern Art in New York as well as most of the top museums and collections in the United States and globally.

Mallory was a student of the late Pol Bury. He worked in many mediums, sculpture, digital art and oil paintings.

Personal life
Mallory was married to actress, model and author Carole Mallory, from 1968 to 1971.

Mallory died of natural causes in San Miguel de Allende, Mexico on July 7, 2021, at age 89.

References

External links
Website of Ronald Mallory

20th-century American sculptors
20th-century American male artists
21st-century American sculptors
21st-century American male artists
American male sculptors
American digital artists
2021 deaths
1939 births